Lukáš Radil (born 5 August 1990) is a Czech professional ice hockey forward currently playing for Dinamo Riga of the Kontinental Hockey League (KHL).

Playing career
Radil began playing as a youth within the Pardubice organization. He made his professional debut with Pardubice at the end of the 2007–08 season, in the Czech Extraliga relegation round.

Undrafted and in his eighth season with Pardubice in 2014–15, Radil marked career highs with 29 assists and 39 points in 52 games. As a free agent, Radil left the Czech Republic for the first time in his career upon signing a one-year contract with Russian club, Spartak Moscow of the Kontinental Hockey League (KHL) on 4 June 2015.

In his first season with Spartak in 2015–16, Radil instantly added offence on the club's scoring line with 32 points in 57 games. He was re-signed to an improved two-year contract during the campaign on 21 January 2016.

At the conclusion of the 2017–18 season, his third with Spartak Moscow and having increased his points total in each season, Radil left as a free agent to pursue his National Hockey League ambitions by agreeing to a one-year contract with the San Jose Sharks on 4 April 2018. On 23 November 2018, Radil made his NHL debut, in a 4–0 victory against the Vancouver Canucks. On 8 December, Radil scored his first NHL goal in the Sharks' 5–3 win over the Arizona Coyotes. Having scored 9 points through his first 18 games, Radil was signed to a one-year contract extension with the Sharks on 6 January 2019.

In the following 2019–20 season, Radil was unable to solidify his role in the NHL with San Jose and was waived on 13 December 2019. A day later, he was reassigned to the Barracuda. He collected 16 points in 28 games with the Barracuda before the season was cancelled due to COVID-19.

With his tenure with the Sharks effectively ended, Radil as an impending free agent opted to return to Russia to join former club, Spartak Moscow of the KHL, on a one-year contract on 9 June 2020. In the following 2020–21 season, Radil regained his scoring touch with Spartak, posting 19 goals and 32 points through 55 regular season games.

As a free agent, Radil left Spartak for the second time, opting to continue in the KHL on a one-year deal with Latvian based club, Dinamo Riga, on 29 June 2021.

Career statistics

Regular season and playoffs

International

References

External links

1990 births
Czech expatriate ice hockey people
Czech expatriate ice hockey players in the United States
Czech ice hockey left wingers
Dinamo Riga players
HC Chrudim players
HC Dynamo Pardubice players
HC Spartak Moscow players
HC Vrchlabí players
Living people
Ice hockey players at the 2018 Winter Olympics
Olympic ice hockey players of the Czech Republic
People from Čáslav
San Jose Barracuda players
San Jose Sharks players
Undrafted National Hockey League players
Sportspeople from the Central Bohemian Region
Expatriate ice hockey players in Latvia
Czech expatriate sportspeople in Latvia
Czech expatriate ice hockey players in Russia